Josette Garnier is a French biogeochemist. She is research director at the French National Centre for Scientific Research (CNRS). She won the 2016 Ruth Patrick Award.

Life 
She graduated from Pierre and Marie Curie University. She studied the price of land in the 1700s and the Riverstrahler model of river nutrient transfer.

Works

References 

Year of birth missing (living people)
Living people
20th-century French women scientists
21st-century French women scientists
Geochemists
Pierre and Marie Curie University alumni
French biochemists

Research directors of the French National Centre for Scientific Research